Crețu is a common family name in Romania. Persons named Crețu include:

Michael Cretu, Romanian-German musician
Sandra Cretu, Michael Cretu's former wife
Gabriela Crețu, Romanian politician
Gheorghe Crețu, Romanian volleyball coach
Corina Crețu, Romanian politician
Vlad Crețu, Romanian musician

See also 
 Crețu, a village in Ciocănești Commune, Dâmbovița County, Romania
 Crețu River (disambiguation)

Romanian-language surnames